Baldwin II may refer to:

Baldwin II of Flanders ( 865–918)
Baldwin II of Boulogne ( 990– 1033)
Baldwin II, Count of Hainaut (1056–1098)
Baldwin II of Jerusalem, King of Jerusalem (died 1131)
Baldwin II of Constantinople, Latin Emperor of Constantinople (1217–1273)

de:Liste der Herrscher namens Balduin#Balduin II.
ru:Балдуин II